The Order of Saint John (Knights of Malta, Knights Hospitaller) was organised in a system of  commanderies during the high medieval to early modern periods, to some extent surviving as the organisational structure of the several descended orders that formed after the Reformation.

In the Late Middle Ages, the bulk of possessions of the order were in the Holy Roman Empire, France, Castile, Aragon and Portugal, but they extended into Poland, Hungary, southern Italy, England and Denmark, with individual outliers in Ireland, Scotland, Sweden and Greece (the main seat of the order was in Rhodes from 1310 until 1522, and in Malta from 1530 until 1798).

Pre-Reformation
Before the Protestant Reformation, the Order was divided into seven langues or tongues. The langues were divided into great priories, some of which were further divided into  priories or bailiwicks (ballei), and these were in turn divided into commanderies.

The largest of the langues by far was the "German" one, which included not only all of the Holy Roman Empire but also the non–German-speaking (Slavic and Hungarian) territories east of Germany. It was divided into five great-priories, the largest of which were Austria-Bohemia and Germany, in turn, divided into major priories or bailiwicks; one of the largest such became independent after the Protestant Reformation as the Order of Saint John (Bailiwick of Brandenburg).

The division of Latin Europe, on the other hand, was more fine-grained, into the 
Hispanic (Iberian peninsula, at first known as the "Aragonese" langue, but in 1462 split into the Aragonese and the "Castilian" langue, the latter including Castille, Léon and Portugal), 
Italian (Italian peninsula), Provençal, Auvergnat and French langues.

Finally, the English langue included the order's possessions in the British Isles.

German tongue

great priory Bohemia-Austria
priory Bohemia: commanderies     Český Dub,    Březina,     Glatz,  Kadaň,    Manětín,    Pfaden,    Ploschkowitz,    Prague,   Strakonice,    Mies
priory Moravia: commanderies     Brno,    Maidelberg,  Tišnov,   Opava
priory Silesia: commanderies Beilau,    Breslau,    Brieg,    Goldberg,    Gröbnig  bei Leobschütz,    Groß-Tinz,    Klein-Öls,    Löwenberg,    Reichenbach,    Striegau
priory Oberlausitz: commanderies     Zittau,    Hirschfelde
priory Archducal Austria:  commanderies   Mailberg,    Laa an der Thaya,    Lockenhaus, Vienna
priory Inner Austria: commanderies    Altenmarkt,    Feldbach,    Fürstenfeld,    Graz,    Komenda,    Melling,    Marburg,    Pulst,    Übersbach
great priory Germany: The great priory of Germany was divided into eight bailiwicks (Balleien). From 1428, the seat of the great priory was at Heitersheim in Upper Germany. 
Ballei Brandenburg (since 1538 the independent Order of Saint John (Bailiwick of Brandenburg)): commanderies    Braunschweig (formerly Templars),    Garlow,    Goslar,    Lage,    Lagow,    Lietzen,    Mirow,    Nemerow,    Quartschen,    Rörchen,    Schlave,    Schivelbein,    Schwiebus,    Sonnenburg,    Stargard,    Sülzdorf,    Süpplingenburg  (formerly Templars),    Tempelhof (formerly Templars),    Tempelburg (formerly Templars),    Werben,    Wietersheim,    Wildenbruch,    Zielenzig,    Zachan
Ballei Franken (Franconia): commanderies    Reichardsroth,    Rothenburg ob der Tauber,    Würzburg,   Biebelried,    Mergentheim,    Schwäbisch Hall
 Ballei Köln (Cologne)
 Bergisches Land: commanderies Burg an der Wupper, Herkenrath,    Herrenstrunden,  Marienhagen
 Niederrhein: commanderies Dinslaken,   Duisburg,    Walsum,   
 Rhineland: commanderies Adenau, Velden bei Düren, Cologne,   Niederbreisig (1312), Mechelen bei Aachen (1215), Aachen (1313)
 Ballei Oberdeutschland (Upper Germany)
 Mainz (1282)
 Breisgau: Freiburg, Heitersheim
 Swabia: commanderies     Überlingen,    Villingen,    Rottweil
 Alsace: commanderies  Colmar (hospital since the late 12th century, commendary before 1234), Dorlisheim (before 1217), Hagenau, Mulhouse (1220), Rheinau (1260), Sulz (c. 1250), Schlettstadt (1260),  Strasbourg (1371)
 Lothringen (Lorraine): commanderies Metz (12th century),     Puttelange-aux-Lacs
 Eidgenossenschaft (Swiss Confederacy): Basel (c. 1200), Bubikon (c. 1192), Biberstein, Biel, Fribourg, Hohenrain (c. 1175), Klingnau, Küsnacht, Leuggern, Münchenbuchsee (1180–1528/29), Reiden (ca. 1284–1807), Rheinfelden (1212–1806),    Salgesch (ca. 1235–1655), Thunstetten (ca. 1192–1528), Tobel (1226–1809), Wädenswil (ca. 1300–1549)
 Ballei Thüringen (Thuringia): Weißensee
 Ballei Utrecht (Netherlands): commanderies    Arnheim,    Buren,    Haarlem,    Ingen,    Kerkwerve,    Middelburg,    Nimwegen,    Montfoort,    Sneek,    Utrecht,    Waarder,    Wemeldinge
 Ballei Westfalen (Westphalia): commanderies Münster, Heford, Bokelesch, Steinfurt
 Ballei Wetterau: commanderies     Mosbach im Bachgau (1218, to Frankfurt in 1400), Nidda,   Frankfurt,  Nieder-Weisel (ca. 1245–1809),    Rüdigheim (Neuberg),    Wiesenfeld (Burgwald),     Wildungen
great priory Hungary: Bjelovar (today in Croatia),    Buda,    Csurgó,    Gran,    Stuhlweissenburg,    Újudvar
great priory Poland
great priory Dacia (Denmark):     Antvorskov,     Odense,    Schleswig,    Viborg

Spanish and Portuguese tongue
great priory Portugal: commanderies    Aboim,    Algoso,    Amieira,    Barrô,    Belver,    Chavão,   Covilhã,    Coimbra,    Faia,    Flor da Rosa,    Fontelo,    Leça do Bailio,    Montenegro,    Moura Morta,    Oliveira do Hospital,    Oleiros,    Puerto Marin,    Poiares,    Sta. Marta Penaguião,    Sertã,    Sobral,    Távora,    Trancoso,    Vera Cruz,    Santarém
great priory Amposta
great priory Castille
great priory Navarra

Italian tongue

great priory Barletta
great priory  Capua
great priory  Sicily
great priory Rome
great priory  Pisa
great priory Lombardy
great priory Venice

Provencal tongue
great priory  St. Gilles
great priory  Toulouse

Auvergnat tongue
great priory Auvergne

French tongue
great priory France
great priory Aquitania
great priory Champagne

English tongue
great priory England
great priory Scotland
great priory Ireland

After the Reformation
A "Russian Grand Priory" with no less than 118 commandries, dwarfing the rest of the Order, was established by Paul I of Russia after the French occupation of Malta in 1798, initiating the Russian tradition of the Knights Hospitaller. Paul's election as Grand Master was, however, never ratified under Roman Catholic canon law, and he was the de facto rather than de jure Grand Master of the Order.

The commandry system survives into the present era, but since the Protestant Reformation  the order is split into the  four "Alliance orders" of  the German Order of Saint John (Bailiwick of Brandenburg), the British Most Venerable Order of the Hospital of Saint John of Jerusalem,  the Swedish Johanniterorden i Sverige, and the Dutch Johanniter Orde in Nederland, the Order forms the Alliance of the Orders of St. John of Jerusalem and the   Roman Catholic Sovereign Military Order of Malta.

The  German (Brandenburg) branch comprises seventeen commandries in Germany, one each in Austria, Finland, France, Hungary, and Switzerland, and a global commandry with subcommandries in twelve other countries (Australia, Belgium, Canada, Colombia, Denmark, Italy, Namibia, Poland, South Africa, the United Kingdom, the United States, and Venezuela).

Following constitutional changes made in 1999, the Priory of England and The Islands was established (including the Commandery of Ards in Northern Ireland) alongside the existing Priories of Wales, Scotland, Canada, Australia (including the Commandery of Western Australia), New Zealand, South Africa, and the United States. In 2013, the Priory of Kenya and in 2014 the Priory of Singapore were formed. Each is governed by a Prior and a Priory Chapter. Commanderies, governed by a Knight or Dame Commander and a Commandery Chapter, may exist within or wholly or partly without the territory of a priory, known as Dependent or Independent Commanderies, respectively. Any country without a priory or commandery of its own is assumed into the "home priory" of England and The Islands, many of these being smaller Commonwealth of Nations states in which the order has only a minor presence.

See also
 Langue (Knights Hospitaller)

References

 Novoa Portela, Feliciano, and Carlos De Ayala Martínez, et al. (eds.): Ritterorden im Mittelalter. Theiss: Stuttgart 2006. .
 Riley-Smith, Jonathan: "Provincial Government and the Estate in Europe", chapter 13 of The Knights Hospitaller in the Levant, c. 1070–1309, Palgrave Macmillan, 2012, 1185–204.
 Rödel, Walter G.: Das Großpriorat Deutschland des Johanniter-Ordens im Übergang vom Mittelalter zur Reformation an Hand der Generalvisitationsberichte von 1494/95 und 1540/41. Köln 1966 (Phil. Diss. Mainz 1965). 2nd ed. 1972.

Bibliography

External links 
 

Knights Hospitaller